Corydalis gotlandica is a species of flowering plant belonging to the family Papaveraceae.

Its native range is Sweden (Gotland, Stora Karlsö).

References

gotlandica
Endemic flora of Sweden